André Luis Silva de Aguiar (born 9 March 1994), known as just André Luis, is a Brazilian professional footballer who plays as a forward for the Portuguese club Moreirense.

Professional career
André Luis began his career in Brazil with Grêmio. André Luis made his professional debut with Grêmio in a 2-1 Campeonato Gaúcho loss to Canoas on 25 January 2013. He then moved to Botafogo where he had various loans in Brazil, before signing with Figueirense in January 2018.

He moved to Portugal with Chaves on 31 August 2018. After a couple seasons with Chaves, he signed with Moreirense on 16 October 2020.

Personal life
In April 2019, Luis had a bout of bacterial meningitis, and had to spend three days in an induced coma, followed by 2 more in intensive care. Afterwards he had 5 days of observation with a neurology department. He ended up missing the rest of the 2019–20 season due to the infection.

References

External links
 
 

1994 births
Living people
Sportspeople from Pará
Brazilian footballers
Grêmio Foot-Ball Porto Alegrense players
Botafogo de Futebol e Regatas players
Boavista Sport Club players
Esporte Clube Rio Verde players
Ypiranga Futebol Clube players
Figueirense FC players
G.D. Chaves players
Moreirense F.C. players
Primeira Liga players
Liga Portugal 2 players
Campeonato Brasileiro Série B players
Campeonato Brasileiro Série C players
Campeonato Brasileiro Série D players
Association football forwards
Brazilian expatriate sportspeople in Portugal
Expatriate footballers in Portugal
Brazilian expatriate footballers